Acanthogilia is a genus with a single species of desert shrub from Baja California, Mexico. It was first scientifically described as a genus in 1986.

Classification
Its closest relatives within the family Polemoniaceae are not clear. Some evidence suggests it was first to diverge from the ancestral member of that family, some puts it in a group with Bonplandia, Cobaea, and Cantua, and some say that those three genera diverged first, followed by Acanthogilia (followed by the rest of the family).

References

Polemoniaceae
Monotypic Ericales genera
Polemoniaceae genera